For the waterfall in Montana with the same name, see Swiftcurrent Falls (Montana).

Swiftcurrent Falls is a major waterfall located on Swiftcurrent Creek near its source.  The falls are one of the taller waterfalls in Canada but have never been officially measured.

Stature
The falls plunge madly down a headwall into the remote Swiftcurrent Creek Valley. Not a lot is known about the falls other than its great height & geology since it is so remote.

Geology
The rock the falls drop over is limestone.  Much of the rock in the mountains in the Mount Robson Provincial Park area is limestone.  Since Swiftcurrent Creek is such a large creek (even near its source) & limestone is very porous rock, the creek has carved large grooves & even tunnels (which the water of the falls flows in & out of) in the headwall.  Most of the time, most of the water flowing over the falls isn't even visible since most of it is underground.  It is believed that in very high water that the falls flow above ground however, generally most of the year most portions of it are underground in the tunnels the falls have carved in the limestone.

See also
Toboggan Falls
Arctomys Falls
Arctomys Cave

References

Waterfalls of British Columbia
Robson Valley
Canadian Rockies